Middle Turkic (Türki or Türkçe) refers to a phase in the development of the Turkic language family, covering much of the Middle Ages (c. 900–1500 CE). In particular the term is used by linguists to refer to a group of Karluk and Oghuz and related languages spoken during this period in Central Asia, Iran, and other parts of the Middle East controlled by the Seljuk Turks.

Classification 
Middle Turkic can be divided into eastern and western branches.

Eastern Middle Turkic consists of Karakhanid (also called Khaqani Turkic), a literary language which was spoken in Kashgar, Balasaghun and other cities along the Silk Road and its later descendents such as Khorezmian and Chagatai. 

The western branch consists of Kipchak languages documented in Codex Cumanicus and various Mamlukean Kipchak texts from Egypt and Syria, and Oghuz Turkic represented by Old Anatolian Turkish. Old Anatolian Turkish was noted to be initially influenced by Eastern Middle Turkic traditions.

Karluk and Oghuz "Middle Turkic" period overlaps with the East Old Turkic period, which covers the 8th to 13th centuries, thus sometimes Karakhanid language is categorized under the "Old Turkic" period.

Literary works
Book of Wisdom (ديوان حكمت) (Dīvān-i Ḥikmet) by Khoja Akhmet Yassawi. (in Karakhanid)
Mahmud al-Kashgari's Divânü Lügati't-Türk (in Karakhanid and Arabic)
Yusuf Balasaghuni's Kutadgu Bilig (in Karakhanid)
Ahmad bin Mahmud Yukenaki (Ahmed bin Mahmud Yükneki) (Ahmet ibn Mahmut Yükneki) (Yazan Edib Ahmed b. Mahmud Yükneki) (w:tr:Edip Ahmet Yükneki) wrote the Hibet-ül hakayik (Hibet ül-hakayık) (Hibbetü'l-Hakaik) (Atebetüʼl-hakayik) (Hibat al-ḥaqāyiq) (هبة الحقايق) (w:tr:Atabetü'l-Hakayık)
The works of Ali-Shir Nava'i (in Chagatai), including (titles in Arabic)
Gharā’ib al-Ṣighār ("Wonders of Childhood")
Nawādir al-Shabāb ("Witticisms of Youth")
Badā’i‘ al-Wasaṭ ("Marvels of Middle Age")
Fawā’id al-Kibār ("Advantages of Old Age")
Muḥākamat al-Lughatayn ("Judgment between the Two Languages")
The Mughal Emperor Babur's Baburnama (in Chagatai)

See also
Karluk languages
Proto-Turkic
Turkish literature

References

Sinor, Dennis. "Old Turkic and Middle Turkic Languages." History of the Civilizations of Central Asia, vol. IV, 2 (2000), pp. 331–334.

Agglutinative languages
Turkic languages
Languages attested from the 9th century
Languages extinct in the 15th century